Sus-Saint-Léger is a commune in the Pas-de-Calais department in the Hauts-de-France region of France.

Geography

Population

Places of interest
 The church of St.Leger, dating from the sixteenth century.
 The eighteenth-century chateau.
 A seventeenth-century manor house.
 Traces of a feudal motte

See also
Communes of the Pas-de-Calais department

References

Sussaintleger